Bourgou may refer to:

Bourgou, Togo
Bourgou (grass) – a grass native to Africa.

See also
Borgou Department in Benin
Borgu (region in NW Nigeria and north Benin)
Bougou, Burkina Faso
Bougou, Côte d'Ivoire
Burgu (disambiguation)